Amorbia decerptana is a species of moth of the family Tortricidae. It is found in Panama, Guatemala and Costa Rica, where it is found at altitudes between 200 and 600 meters.

The length of the forewings is 8–9.5 mm. The ground colour of the forewings is straw yellow with two small patches of dark scales at the postmedian fascia. The hindwings are beige.

References

Moths described in 1877
Sparganothini
Moths of Central America